The United States Senate election of 1970 in Connecticut was held on November 3, 1970. Republican Lowell Weicker defeated Democratic candidate Joseph Duffey and incumbent Thomas J. Dodd who ran this time, as an independent. Dodd entered the race at the last minute and split the Democratic vote, allowing Weicker to win with only 42% of the vote.

Democratic primary

Candidates
 Alphonsus Donahue, Stamford businessman
 Joseph Duffey, anti-war activist
 Edward L. Marcus, President of the Connecticut Senate

Results

Republican primary

Candidates
 John Lupton, State Senator
 Lowell Weicker, U.S. Representative from Greenwich

Results

Results

External links
Dissent of the Governed, a documentary made by and about the Duffey campaign

References

Connecticut
1970
1970 Connecticut elections